The swimming competition at the 1987 Pan American Games took place from August to August 15 at the Indiana University Natatorium in Indianapolis, Indiana, USA.

The highlights were the great performances from Anthony Nesty (a gold and bronze) and Silvia Poll (three golds, three silvers and two bronzes), originating in countries with little tradition in swimming (Suriname and Costa Rica, respectively), who obtained great results in this edition of the Games. Also featured for Hilton Woods, from the small Netherlands Antilles, who won the first medal in the history of his country in swimming at Pan American Games, a bronze in the men's 50m free. Mark Andrews, from Trinidad and Tobago, did the same for his country.

Results

Men’s events

Women’s events

Medal table

References
USA Swimming
Results
Folha Online

 
Swimming at the Pan American Games
Pan American Games
Events at the 1987 Pan American Games
Swimming in Indiana